Eftekhar Dadehbala (16 November 1946 – 25 June 2007), known by her stage name Mahasti, was an Iranian singer of Persian classical, folk, and pop music with a mezzo-soprano vocal range. She was active for more than four decades.

Early life and career

Khadijeh Eftekhar Dadehbala was born on 16 November 1946, in Tehran, Iran. She was the younger sister of Iranian singer Hayedeh. Their parents later divorced and married other people. Mahasti started her career on the Persian traditional music radio program "Gol hâ ye Rangârang" ( "Colorful Flowers") in 1963, with the song "Ân ke Delam Râ Borde Khodâyâ" composed and arranged by maestro Parviz Yahaghi with lyrics by Bijan Taraghi.

In the beginning, Mahasti's family was reluctant to allow her to pursue a career in entertainment because it was not an appreciated career for women in Iran at that time. However, Mahasti overcame this stigma providing Iran with a new image for women within the entertainment industry.

Mahasti created an image of a "gentle-woman" singer, a lady with great manners. Her enormous success in music opened the pathway for many other women, including her elder sister, Hayedeh, who started her work 5 years after Mahasti. The two sisters had tremendous contributions to improving the image of female singers in Iran and in transitioning the Iranian music from where it was to where it is now.

In 1978, before the Iranian Revolution. she emigrated to the United Kingdom, and then to the United States in 1981, where she lived thereafter.

Death and burial

In March 2007, Mahasti publicly announced that she had been battling colon cancer for four years. She hoped that her experience would raise awareness within the Iranian community regarding cancer and the importance of regular physical examinations. She was then living in Santa Rosa, California with her daughter, Sahar, her husband, Naser, and their two children, Natasha and Natalie, her only grandchildren. She died on 25 June 2007, aged 60, in Santa Rosa.

Mahasti was interred at the Westwood Village Memorial Park Cemetery in Westwood, California on 29 June 2007, the same cemetery where her sister Hayedeh was also buried.

Her funeral was broadcast live on Persian Broadcasting Company Tapesh and was attended by many Persian celebrities and stars and other artists including the mayor of Beverly Hills Jimmy Delshad and designer Bijan Pakzad.

Discography

Albums
 Parandeye Mohajer (1981)
 Eyde Shoma Mobarak (1982) with Sattar & Manoucher Cheshmazar
 Moj (1983)
 Yeki Ra Doost Midaram (1983) with Hayedeh & Houshmand Aghili
 Asheghaneha (1983) with Hayedeh
 Zendegi (1985) with Hayedeh
 Tou Bezan ta Man Beraghsam (1985)
 Gol-haye Ranga-Rang (1988)
 Sepideh Dam (1990)
 Masti (1990)
 Asir (1990)
 Ziyafat (1991)
 Mosafer (1991)
 Ghasam (1993)
 Gole Omid (1993)
 Nameh (1994)
 Ashofteh (1994)
 Beganneh (1994)
 Havay Yaar (1994)
 Parandeha (1995, with Leila Forouhar, Shahram Solati)
 Hagheghat (1995)
 Bazm Mahasty & Sattar (1996)
 Saraabe Eshgh (1996)
 Labkhand (1996) with Shahram Solati
 Havaye Asheghi (1998)
 Avazak (1999)
 Hamishe Ashegh (1999)
 Gole Gandom (2000, with Sattar)
 Deldadeh (2001)
 Hamisheh Sabz (2003)
 Az Khoda Khasteh (2004)

Also appeared on:
Khatereh 2 (1983) with Hayedeh & Homeyra
Nargez Shiraz(1984) with Sattar, Hayedeh
Entekhabi 2 (Sarbaz Kocholoo) (1984)
Entekhabi 3 (Ghanari) (1985)
Khatereh 4 (1985) with Ebi, Sattar, Hayedeh
Khatereh 5 (1986) with Hayedeh, Sadegh Nojouki, Hooshmand Aghili
Entekhabi 7 (Gozashtehaye Shirin) (1986)
Entekhabi 8 (Kieh Kieh) (1986)
Entekhabi 9 (Ya Mowla) (1987)
Tanine Solh (1987)
Saghare Hasti (1987) with Moein, Hayedeh, Bahram Forouhar
Ganjineh 1 (1987) with Moein, Sattar, Hayedeh
Parastooha (1988) with Sattar, Hayedeh
Entekhabi 11 (Bi Nazir) (1991)
Hamsafare Eshgh (1993) with Sattar, Delaram, Fataneh, Ahmad Azad
Khaneh Ashgegh Koojast (1993) with Homeyra, Sattar, Shohreh, Martik, Emad Ram

Singles
 2007: Music (with Leila Forouhar, Andy, Aref)

See also

 Persian pop music
 Music of Iran
 Persian women musicians
 Hayedeh

Notes

References

External links

1946 births
2007 deaths
People from Tehran
Singers from Tehran
20th-century singers
Iranian folk singers
Iranian women singers
Caltex Records artists
Women singers on Golha
Persian-language singers
Iranian classical singers
Iranian women pop singers
Iranian singer-songwriters
20th-century women singers
Deaths from colorectal cancer
Deaths from cancer in California
20th-century Iranian women singers
American people of Iranian descent
Iranian emigrants to the United States
Iranian emigrants to the United Kingdom
Burials at Westwood Village Memorial Park Cemetery
Exiles of the Iranian Revolution in the United States
Exiles of the Iranian Revolution in the United Kingdom